is a railway station in the town of Kawanehon, Haibara District, Shizuoka Prefecture, Japan operated by the Ōigawa Railway.

Lines

Station layout
The station has a single island platform connected to a small wooden station building by a level crossing. The station is staffed.

Adjacent stations

|-
!colspan=5|Ōigawa Railway

Station history
Jina Station was one of the original stations of the Ōigawa Main Line, and was opened on July 16, 1930.

Passenger statistics
In fiscal 2017, the station was used by an average of 8 passengers daily (boarding passengers only).

Surrounding area
Japan National Route 473

See also
 List of Railway Stations in Japan

References

External links

 Ōigawa Railway home page

Stations of Ōigawa Railway
Railway stations in Shizuoka Prefecture
Railway stations in Japan opened in 1930
Kawanehon, Shizuoka